Keys of the Righteous is a surviving 1918 American silent drama film directed by Jerome Storm and written by C. Gardner Sullivan. The film stars Enid Bennett, Earle Rodney, George Nichols, Josef Swickard, Karl Formes, and Gertrude Claire. The film was released on February 18, 1918, by Paramount Pictures.

Plot

Cast

Preservation status 
A print exists in the Library of Congress collection.

Reception
Like many American films of the time, Keys of the Righteous was subject to cuts by city and state film censorship boards. For example, the Chicago Board of Censors cut, in Reel 4, the striking of man on head with cane, closeup of two men exchanging glances regarding young woman, all dance hall scenes up to time young woman is seen at table with father, man with arm around young woman at table in cabaret, stout woman talking to young woman at table with father, woman soliciting man at door of saloon, the intertitle "Leave me alone, I'm broke", Reel 5, two intertitles "A charge which if proven" etc. and "If you father was looking for you there" etc., and all scenes of woman derelicts before judge at bar.

References

External links 
 
 

1918 films
1910s English-language films
Silent American drama films
1918 drama films
Paramount Pictures films
Films directed by Jerome Storm
American black-and-white films
American silent feature films
1910s American films